Nil by Mouth may refer to:

 Nothing by mouth or nil by mouth, a medical instruction
 Nil by Mouth (album), a 2015 album by Blancmange
 Nil by Mouth (charity), an anti-sectarian charity in Glasgow, Scotland
 Nil by Mouth (film), a 1997 British film directed by Gary Oldman
 "Nil by Mouth", a 2001 song by Blindspott
 "Nil by Mouth", a 2018 instrumental by Haken from Vector
 "Nil by Mouth", a 2021 song by Dean Blunt from Black Metal 2